Jo Martin (born 29 April) is a British actress. She played Natalie Crouch in the BBC One sitcom The Crouches, which aired between 2003 and 2005. She joined the cast of Holby City in 2019 as neurosurgeon Max McGerry. Martin portrayed an incarnation of the Doctor known as the Fugitive Doctor in Doctor Who.

Early life
Martin was born in Newham, London to a Jamaican mother, who died in 2015. She attended Portway Primary School and Plashet All Girls Secondary School.

Doctor Who

Martin first appeared in the series 12 episode "Fugitive of the Judoon", playing Ruth Clayton, a tourist guide who is later revealed to be an incarnation of the Doctor known as the Fugitive Doctor. She reprised her role in the series finale, "The Timeless Children", in the third chapter of Doctor Who: Flux, "Once, Upon Time", and in the 2022 special "The Power of the Doctor".

Martin is currently set to star in The Fugitive Doctor Adventures, an audio drama series focused on her character to be produced by Big Finish.

Tales from the Front Line
In November 2020, Talawa Theatre Company released Tales from the Front Line. The first film presented a verbatim narrative from a teacher, played by Martin, talking about trying to keep themselves and their pupils safe during the pandemic, the emotional and psychological impact of the global Black Lives Matter movement, and the challenges of supporting students' education during an era of great uncertainty.

Reviews described Martin's performance as "performed so subtly" as to seem real, while being "conversational and natural".

Filmography

Film

Television

Video

References

External links
 

Living people
Year of birth missing (living people)
Actresses from London
Black British actresses
English film actresses
English people of Jamaican descent
English television actresses
20th-century English actresses
21st-century English actresses